The Franco-American Fulbright Commission (officially, the Commission franco-américaine d'échanges universitaires et culturels) is a bi-national commission established between the United States of America and the French Republic by the Fulbright-Hays Act of 1961 (P.L. 87-256) and the Franco-American Treaty of May 7, 1965. The Commission administers the Fulbright Program in France and operates the US State Department's EducationUSA advising center for France.

Fulbright Grants
Pursuant to the Fulbright Act of 1946 and the Fulbright-Hays Act of 1961, the Franco-American Fulbright Commission awards Fulbright grants to US citizens to study in France and to French citizens to study in the United States.

EducationUSA Advising Center
The EducationUSA center advises French citizens who intend to study at universities in the United States. The center promotes US universities as part of the public diplomacy of the United States.

See also
 Commission for Educational Exchange between the United States of America, Belgium, and Luxembourg
 Austrian-American Educational Commission

References

American education awards
Bureau of Educational and Cultural Affairs
United States Department of State
Student exchange
Scholarships in the United States
France–United States relations